Organica may refer to:

Business
Organica Technologies, a Hungarian wastewater treatment company
Organica (ko), a South Korean food company, a subsidiary of the Herald Corporation
Organica, a speciality chemicals company in Wolfen, Germany

Entertainment
Organica: Solo Saxophones, Volume 2, a 2011 album by David S. Ware
Organica, a 2002 album by David Celia
Organica, a 1999 album by Kill Switch...Klick
Organica, a multi-media concert and album series created by Christoph Bull